The Scenic Rim Region is a local government area in West Moreton region of South East Queensland, Australia. Established in 2008, it was preceded by several previous local government areas with histories extending back to the early 1900s and beyond. The main town of the region is Beaudesert.

It has an estimated operating budget of A$33 million.

History 

Prior to 2008, the new Scenic Rim Region was an entire area of three previous and distinct local government areas:

 the Shire of Boonah;
 the southern part of the Shire of Beaudesert;
 and the Harrisville and Peak Crossing areas from the City of Ipswich.

In July 2007, the Local Government Reform Commission released its report and recommended that the areas amalgamate. It identified a rural community of interest as well as ecotourism potential from the Scenic Rim, a group of mountain ranges forming part of the Great Dividing Range, and recommended the transfer of the entire urban growth corridor previously within Beaudesert to Logan City. Along with Lockyer Valley and Somerset, it was expected to provide a rural hinterland for urban South East Queensland. The arrangement was Boonah's second preference (its first was simply absorbing the rural areas of Ipswich) while Beaudesert opposed splitting or amalgamation.

The legislation passed to effect the merger on 10 August 2007. A Local Transition Committee made up of staff and councillors of the dissolving entities was formed to manage the process. On 15 March 2008, the Shires formally ceased to exist, and elections were held on the same day to elect councillors and a mayor to the Regional Council.

Geography 

The region is mostly rural, with Beaudesert and Boonah the main towns. It lies within the catchment areas of the Bremer River, the Logan River/Albert River and the Coomera River/Nerang River. The centre of the area is dominated by the Flinders Peak Group and broad sweep of mountainous terrain forming a southern boundary with the local government area on Queensland's southern border with New South Wales. Many high-altitude areas are covered by forests and protected in national parks (including World Heritage listings) at Tamborine Mountain, McPherson Range, Main Range National Park, Mount Barney National Park and landforms including Cunninghams Gap and Fassifern Valley. Wyaralong Dam is the region's newest reservoir.

In the south east of the local government area is the Lamington National Park.  It includes villages such as Canungra, Kooralbyn, Rathdowney, Beechmont and Harrisville.  The peak at Mount French, part of Moogerah Peaks National Park is noted for its traditional rock climbing and does not have bolted climbing routes.   The peak also boasts a '32' rated climb (one of the hardest in the world) which attracts international rock climbing visitors to the area.  The area of Boonah is fairly flat with large areas of very productive soils for the growing of vegetables and other crops.  Beechmont and O'Reillys are mountainous areas overlooking the Gold Coast hinterland.  These areas attract visitors for camping, bushwalking and bird watching.

Divisions
The council is split into 6 divisions, each returning one councillor, plus a mayor.

Mayors 
John Brent is one of the longest continuing serving elected members in Australia with almost 40 years of service and over twenty as mayor. He was first elected as a councillor in the Shire of Boonah in 1976 and was chairman of the Shire of Boonah since 12 April 1994, becoming mayor of the Scenic Rim Region following the amalgamation.

Greg Christensen was elected mayor in 2016.

Mayors of Scenic Rim Region

Towns and localities 

The Scenic Rim Region includes the following settlements:

Beaudesert area:
 Beaudesert
 Beechmont
 Benobble
 Biddaddaba
 Birnam
 Boyland
 Bromelton
 Canungra
 Christmas Creek
 Cryna
 Gleneagle
 Hillview
 Innisplain
 Josephville

 Kerry
 Kooralbyn
 Lamington
 Lamington National Park
 Laravale
 Palen Creek
 Rathdowney
 Tabooba
 Tabragalba
 Tamborine Mountain
 Tamrookum
 Tamrookum Creek
 Witheren
 Wonglepong

Boonah area:
 Boonah
 Aratula
 Charlwood
 Coulson
 Fassifern
 Harrisville1
 Kalbar
 Maroon
 Moogerah
 Mount Alford
 Mount Walker
 Roadvale
 Rosevale
 Silverdale
 Tarome
 Templin
 Warrill View

Other areas:

 Allandale
 Allenview
 Anthony
 Barney View
 Binna Burra
 Blantyre
 Bunburra
 Bunjurgen
 Burnett Creek
 Cainbable
 Cannon Creek
 Carneys Creek
 Chinghee Creek
 Clumber
 Coleyville
 Coochin
 Croftby
 Darlington
 Dugandan
 Fassifern Valley
 Ferny Glen
 Flying Fox
 Frazerview

 Frenches Creek
 Hoya
 Illinbah
 Kagaru
 Kents Lagoon
 Kents Pocket
 Knapp Creek
 Kulgun
 Limestone Ridges1
 Lower Mount Walker
 Merryvale
 Milbong
 Milford
 Milora
 Moorang
 Morwincha
 Mount Barney
 Mount Edwards
 Mount Forbes1
 Mount French
 Mount Gipps
 Mount Lindesay
 Mount Walker West

 Munbilla
 Mutdapilly1
 Nindooinbah
 North Tamborine
 Oaky Creek
 Obum Obum
 O'Reilly
 Peak Crossing1
 Radford
 Running Creek
 Sarabah
 Southern Lamington
 Tamborine2
 Teviotville
 Undullah2
 Veresdale2
 Veresdale Scrub2
 Wallaces Creek
 Washpool
 Wilsons Plains
 Woolooman
 Wyaralong

1 - split with the City of Ipswich
2 - split with Logan City

Population

The populations given relate to the component entities prior to 2008.

Heritage register
In 2014, the Scenic Rim Regional Council established its local heritage register as required by the Queensland Heritage Act 1992. In February 2015, it listed 54 places based on criteria in the Australia ICOMOS Burra Charter 1999.

Libraries 
The Scenic Rim Regional Council operate libraries in Beaudesert, Boonah, Canungra and Tamborine Mountain. The council commenced  a mobile library service in 2008, which serves  Beechmont, Harrisville, Hillview, Kalbar, Kooralbyn, Peak Crossing, Rathdowney and Tamborine.

References

Further reading

External links

 

 
Scenic Rim
2008 establishments in Australia